Gavin Williams may refer to:

 Gavin Williams (sociologist) (born 1943), South African Africanist and sociologist
 Gavin Williams (rugby union) (born 1979), rugby union player from New Zealand, who plays for Samoa
 Gavin Williams (footballer) (born 1980), Welsh footballer
 Gavin Williams (cricketer) (born 1984), Antiguan cricketer
 Gavin Williams (baseball) (born 1999), American baseball pitcher

See also
Paul Gavin Williams, bishop